The Brazil women's national handball team is the national team of Brazil. It is governed by the Confederação Brasileira de Handebol and takes part in international handball competitions.

History
In December 2013, the team won the World Championship for the first time in history after defeating Serbia 22–20 in the final. The Brazilian team won all nine games played in the tournament and became the first nation from Americas, Southern Hemisphere and only the second non-European country (after South Korea) to win the title.

Results

Olympic Games

World Championships

Pan American Games

Pan American Championship

South and Central American Championship

South American Games

Other tournaments

GF World Cup 2006 – Seventh place
2014 International Tournament of Spain – 
2015 Angola 40 Years Tournament – Third place
2015 Carpathian Trophy – Fourth place
2016 Firenasjonersturneringer – Fourth place
2016 Women's Four Nations Tournament – 
2017 Women's Four Nations Tournament – 
2017 Carpathian Trophy – Third place

2018 World University Handball Championship – 
2018 Women's International Tournament of Spain – Second place
2019 Women's International Tournament of Spain – Third place
2019 Intersport Cup – Third place
2019 Japan Cup – Third place
2021 HEP Croatia Cup - Second place
2022 Intersport Cup – Fourth place

Current squad
Squad for the 2021 World Women's Handball Championship.

Head coach: Cristiano Silva

Head coach history

References

External links

IHF profile

National team
Handball
Women's national handball teams